Oppelt is a German surname. Notable people with the surname include:

Britta Oppelt (born 1978), German rower
Kurt Oppelt (1932–2015), Austrian figure skater
Valérie Oppelt (born 1973), French politician

See also
Oppel

German-language surnames